Alexis Ellis is an IFBB professional fitness and figure competitor.

Alexis Ellis was born in New York City.  She participated in activities such as dancing and ballet before she became involved in fitness competition.  Upon graduating from Columbia University with a B.S. in Biological Science, she went to live in Southern California.  It was in Southern California where Alexis began her fitness career, when she competed in the NPC Orange County Classic, and placed third.  She has since won two competitions in the tall class, which are the NPC Los Angeles Figure Competition of 2003 and the NPC Ironman Pro Invitational Figure Extravaganza of 2005.

Stats
Height  5'8"
Biceps  12"
Chest   38D
Waist   24"
Hips    38"
Quads   24"
Calves  16"
Off-season weight  145 lbs
Competition weight 135 lbs

Competitive history

2003 NPC Orange County Classic Competition, 3rd
2003 NPC Los Angeles Figure Competition, 1st and Overall
2004 NPC Ironman Pro Invitational Figure Extravaganza, 3rd
2004 NPC Figure Nationals, 5th
2005 NPC Ironman Pro Invitational Figure Extravaganza, 1st and Overall
2005 NPC Jr Nationals, 4th
2005 NPC USA Figure Championships, 6th
2005 NPC Figure Nationals, 2nd (Qualified for IFBB Professional Status)
2006 IFBB Colorado Pro Figure, 18th place
2006 IFBB California Pro Figure, 18th place

References
AlexisEllis.com.  Alexis Ellis' Stats.  Accessed 11/6/2006. http://www.alexisellis.com/measurement.html

External links
Official site of Alexis Ellis

Fitness and figure competitors
Living people
Year of birth missing (living people)